Michael Dickson may refer to:

 Michael Dickson (American football) (born 1996), Australian gridiron football punter
 Michael Dickson (Irish republican), Scottish former Provisional Irish Republican Army (IRA) volunteer
 Michael Dickson (engineer) (1944–2018), British structural engineer
 Michael Dickson (educator) (born 1977), executive director of StandWithUs Israel
 Michael Dickson (skier) (born 1975), Australian Olympic skier
 Michael Dickson (hurdler) (born 1994), American track and field sprint hurdler

See also
 Michael Dixon (disambiguation)